Hura is a genus of trees in the family Euphorbiaceae described by Carl Linnaeus in 1753. It is native to South America, Mesoamerica, and the West Indies.

Species
 Hura crepitans L. - from Nicaragua + Bahamas south to Bolivia; naturalized in parts of Africa (Guinea, Guinea-Bissau, Benin, Central African Republic)
 Hura polyandra Baill. - Mexico, Central America, Ecuador

Names in homonymic genus
In 1783, Johann Gerhard König used the name Hura to refer to a very different plant from the one Linnaeus had named. Thus was created an illegitimate homonym. Under the rules of nomenclature, Koenig's name had to be abandoned. The two names created using his genus are now in the genus Globba, as follows:
 Hura koenigii - Globba pendula (Zingiberaceae)
 Hura siamensium - Globba pendula (Zingiberaceae)

References

Euphorbiaceae genera
Euphorbioideae